Dichomeris mica is a moth in the family Gelechiidae. It was described by Ronald W. Hodges in 1986. It is found in North America, where it has been recorded from Texas and New Mexico.

References

Moths described in 1986
mica